The latest holder of Malaysian Minister of Local Government Development has been Nga Kor Ming since 3 December 2022. The minister is supported by Deputy Minister of Local Government Development.The minister administers the portfolio through the Ministry of Local Government Development.

List of ministers of local government/local government development
The following individuals have been appointed as Minister of Local Government/Local Government Development, or any of its precedent titles:

Political Party:

List of ministers of town planning
The following individuals have been appointed as Minister of Town Planning, or any of its precedent titles:

Political Party:

List of ministers of housing
The following individuals have been appointed as Minister of Housing, or any of its precedent titles:

Political Party:

List of ministers of federal territories 
The following individuals have been appointed as Minister of Federal Territories, or any of its precedent titles:

Political Party:

List of ministers of new villages
The following individuals have been appointed as Minister of New Villages, or any of its precedent titles:

Political Party:

List of ministers of urban wellbeing
The following individuals have been appointed as Minister of Urban Wellbeing, or any of its precedent titles:

Political Party:

References

Lists of government ministers of Malaysia
Housing ministers